College of Corpo Santo, Lisbon was an Irish Dominican College in Lisbon, founded in 1634 by Daniel O'Daly OP, who was its first Rector. The College of Corpo Santo at Cais do Sodré was built in 1659 for the Irish Dominicans, supported by King Philip of Spain (who was also King of Portugal at the time). 
Since so many ordained priests who returned to Ireland were killed during the Penal Laws the seminary was called the Martyr's Seminary.
The College was greatly damaged in the Great Lisbon Earthquake of 1755, and it was not re-built until 1771.
It ceased as a seminary after 1850, with the Irish Dominicans in San Clemente al Laterano, Rome available to train candidates for the order, and with the last significant Penal Laws removed in 1829, much of the property was sold to fund the establishment of St. Mary's Priory, Tallaght, Dublin.

The Church, rebuilt in the 1770s, following the earthquake, sold in the 19th century, the Igreja do Corpo Santo, Cais do Sodré, Lisbon, still stands and contains the symbols of the Irish Dominican on its facade.

Corpo  Santo  Altar  Wine was a wine made under the supervision of the Irish Dominicans in Lisbon, at their Vineyards, Lumiar,  Lisbon, which conformed to the  Canonical Laws, and exported to Ireland as Alter wine. 

At the Convent of Our Lady of Bom Successo, the Dominican convent community remained open until recenlty. Established in 1639 by Daniel O'Daly OP, Rector of Corpo Santo, and Dona Maria Magdalena de Silva Meneses of the House of the Marquis de Marialva. The Irish Dominican sisters left Lisbon in 2016 and the last Irish Dominican priests left in 2021, on July 11, 2022, there was a seminar hosted by the Irish Embassy in Portugal in the College of Bom Successo, marking the departure.

Other Rectors of the Dominican college include Bernard Russell, Laurence Barry, Raymond Butler, William Grace, John O'Brien STM, and Luke Hackett. Raymond M. Dowdall OP moved from Irish Dominican College in Rome to serve the Irish dominican Community in Corpo Santo, in 1950. Michael MacDonagh OP, Bishop of Kilmore, is buried in Corpo Santo.

Dominican clergy educated in Lisbon 
 Rev. Edmund Ffrench OP, Bishop of Kilmacduagh and Kilfenora, educated at the Dominican, College of Corpo Santo, Lisbon
 Rev. Michael Peter MacMahon OP, Bishop of Killaloe, educated at the Dominican, College of Corpo Santo, Lisbon
 Rev. Robert Spence OP, Archbishop of Adelaide, studied at Corpo Santo, first mass said at Bom Sucesso
 Rev. William Harold Vincent, STM, OP, educated in Corpo Santo, professor and briefly rector 1821
 Rev. John Pius Leahy OP, Bishop of Dromore after spending 30 years in Lisbon, rising to be Professor of Philosophy, Theology and Ecclesiastical History

See also
 Irish College at Lisbon
 San Clemente al Laterano, Rome (Irish Dominicans)
 Irish College at Salamanca

References

Catholic seminaries
1590 establishments in Portugal
Irish diaspora in Europe
Lisbon